Slaveco. was a Canadian alternative rock band active from 2002 to 2003.  The group was composed of three former members of the group OCEAN3, joined by Ken Chinn (Mr. Chi Pig), the lead singer of the influential skate punk band SNFU.

History
The band members first met when SNFU and OCEAN3 shared a touring bill, and later a practice space, in 2000.  OCEAN3 bassist Matt Warhurst briefly played in SNFU the following year before the group entered a hiatus, coinciding with OCEAN3's breakup.  Warhurst, along with former OCEAN3 bandmates guitarist Jay Black and drummer Shane Smith, next briefly played in the new group Based on a True Story with SNFU guitarist Marc Belke.  Based on a True Story broke up the following year when Belke relocated to Toronto, and Black, Warhurst and Smith recruited Chinn to form the new group Slaveco.

The band took their moniker from Chinn's nickname for his former place of employment, Save-Co, and played a style of rock more diverse than SNFU's punk rock or OCEAN3's heavy metal styles.  Slaveco. toured and began work on a full-length record, but the record was never completed.  They became inactive late in 2003 when Belke, Chinn, and Warhurst returned their attention to SNFU, completing work on their seventh studio record and later recruiting Smith complete the touring lineup.

Following Slaveco.'s demise, all members remained musically active.  Warhurst and Smith both spent time in Dave Ogilvie's industrial rock project Jakalope.  Chinn and former bassist Ken Fleming formed a new incarnation of SNFU in 2007, which also featured Smith for a time.

References

External links
Slaveco. at MySpace

Canadian alternative rock groups
Canadian punk rock groups